Vecepia Poneia Towery-Robinson is an American office manager and reality TV personality, best known for winning Survivor: Marquesas, the fourth season of Survivor.

Early life and career
Towery was born in Portland, Oregon, where she attended Grant High School and Portland Community College before going on to receive her bachelor's degree in human services from Troy State University in Alabama. She served six years in the U.S. Air Force, assigned to the 32nd Security Police Squadron. She served in Soesterberg, Netherlands for several years and was later inducted into the Air Force's Europe Sports Hall of Fame She was stationed in Turkey during Operation Desert Storm.

Towery once managed the office at a software development company. She has also worked as the guest relations manager for St. Rose Hospital in Hayward, California.

Survivor

In 2001, Towery decided to apply for the reality TV competition show Survivor. Despite searching the Internet and contacting CBS' New York headquarters directly, she was unable to find information on how to apply, and quickly gave up her quest. About a month later, claiming to have received a sign from God, she resumed her search and found the application information that she needed at CBS' own website. Shortly thereafter, she was cast on Survivor: Marquesas, the series' fourth season.

Originally part of the Maraamu tribe, Towery was not a target at the beginning of the game. When her tribe lost the first immunity challenge, she did not join the rest of her tribe to vote out Peter Harkey, but—together with Sean Rector—voted for Sarah Jones, believing that she was not pulling her weight. When Maraamu lost immunity once again in Episode Two, she joined Rector, Rob Mariano and Jones to vote out the tribe's motherly figure, Patricia Jackson, due to her bossy attitude. When the tribe lost immunity once again in Episode Three, the new alliance of four targeted the tribe's strongest member, Hunter Ellis, and he was voted out.

In Episode Four, a tribal shuffle resulted in Towery moving from the Maraamu tribe to the Rotu tribe, along with Mariano and Rector. But Jones was left on Maraamu alone and was voted out shortly after. An immunity win in Episode Six ensured Mariano, Rector, and Towery safety going into the merge.

When the two tribes merged into one, Soliantu, the old-Rotu members targeted the alliance of Towery, Rector and Mariano. Seemingly doomed, Mariano was the first targeted due to his excessive scheming; even Towery voted for him at tribal council as a way to distance herself from her old alliance. At the Final Nine, Towery and Rector convinced Kathy Vavrick-O'Brien to side with them against the Rotu Four, but they also needed the votes of Paschal English and Neleh Dennis to ensure a majority. Both English and Dennis were against the idea, but an immunity challenge which revealed the pecking order of the game, and which showed the arrogance of the Rotu alliance, allowed them to see they were playing for fifth or sixth place. As a result, Dennis and English sided with Towery, Rector and Vavrick-O'Brien, and voted out John Carroll, the Rotu alliance leader.

With the new five-way alliance holding the power, it systematically voted out the members of the broken alliance one after the other, beginning with Zoe Zanidakis, then Tammy Leitner, and finally Robert DeCanio. At the Final Five, Towery and Rector let Vavrick-O'Brien know she was clearly a swing vote as the bond between Dennis and English was too strong to be broken. Despite denying a two-way alliance between themselves, Rector and Towery stayed together and voted against Dennis. But Vavrick-O'Brien sided with Dennis and English, and Rector was voted out, leaving Towery without any allies.

Obviously the next target, Towery knew she needed to win immunity and did exactly that, guaranteeing herself a spot in the Final Three. Immediately Vavrick-O'Brien, realizing she could be voted out, made a Final Two alliance with Towery. They voted against Dennis who, along with English, voted against Vavrick-O'Brien, resulting in a very tight deadlock. Having two minutes to decide, the four could not reach a decision and a tie-breaker was put in place. Because Towery had immunity, the remaining three castaways drew rocks in order to determine who was voted out. English, even though he had never received any votes against him, drew the purple rock and was eliminated. This was a very controversial move by the Survivor producers and was even admitted to being a mistake. From that point on, the drawing of rocks has never been used in a Final Four situation, with the producers opting to use a fire-building challenge instead.

Once in the Final Three, Vavrick-O'Brien and Towery's alliance seemed sure to hold out, but when the former fell in the endurance immunity challenge, the latter made a deal to give immunity to Dennis in exchange for taking Towery to the Final Two. Dennis agreed and Vavrick-O'Brien was voted out. Once in the Final Two, both Towery and Dennis faced accusations of hypocrisy by the jury, and Towery explained that she was playing a very strategic game. In the end, Towery beat out Dennis in a 4–3 vote to become the Sole Survivor, gaining the votes of Carroll, Leitner, DeCanio, and Rector.

Towery was the first African American contestant to win Survivor, succeeded by Earl Cole of Survivor: Fiji, Jeremy Collins of Survivor: Cambodia, Wendell Holland of Survivor: Ghost Island and Maryanne Oketch of Survivor 42.

Personal life
While Survivor: Marquesas was still airing, Towery married Leander Robinson, who had made a brief appearance on the episode where loved ones of the remaining castaways came to visit. The birth of their son, was later the subject of an episode of TLC's A Baby Story. Her nephew, Roy L. Williams, is a former football star who played safety for the Dallas Cowboys.

References

https://ew.com/tv/survivor-42-winner-maryanne-mike-romeo-jonathan-lindsay/

External links
Official CBS biography page

1965 births
Living people
African-American female military personnel
African-American television personalities
United States Air Force personnel of the Gulf War
Participants in American reality television series
Television personalities from Portland, Oregon
Survivor (American TV series) winners
Troy University alumni
United States Air Force airmen
Women in the United States Air Force
Women in warfare post-1945
African Americans in Oregon
20th-century African-American women
20th-century African-American people
21st-century African-American people
21st-century African-American women
African-American United States Air Force personnel
African-American history in Portland, Oregon
Winners in the Survivor franchise